Julia Laskin is the William F. and Patty J. Miller Professor of Analytical Chemistry at Purdue University. Her research is focused on the fundamental understanding of ion-surface collisions, understanding of phenomena underlying chemical analysis of large molecules in complex heterogeneous environments, and the development of new instrumentation and methods in preparative and imaging mass spectrometry.

Early life and education 
Laskin was born in Russia. She has said that she had a very good chemistry teacher at high school. She moved to Peter the Great St. Petersburg Polytechnic University, where she earned a master's of science in 1990. When Perestroika opened the borders and allowed people to leave Russia, Laskin and her husband left the country. Laskin moved to the Hebrew University of Jerusalem, where she worked toward a doctoral degree under the supervision of Chava Lifshitz. She earned her PhD in 1998 and moved to the University of Delaware, where she worked as a postdoctoral scholar in chemistry. In 2000, Laskin joined the Pacific Northwest National Laboratory as a postdoctoral fellow. She was appointed a Research Scientist at the United States Department of Energy Environmental Molecular Sciences Laboratory in 2003.

Research and career 
Laskin works in gas phase ion chemistry. She has been involved with the development of analytical techniques to better characterize synthetic and natural polymers. She showed that the soft-landing of mass-selected ions is a powerful technique to study catalysts. She has also worked on the development of bioanalytical and environmental mass spectrometry.

Laskin served on the editorial board for the Journal of the American Society for Mass Spectrometry (2011-2016). She is an editor of the International Journal of Mass Spectrometry, and serves on the editorial advisory board for Mass Spectrometry Reviews. She is Chair of the American Chemical Society Joint Board Council Committee on Publications. She is the President of the American Society for Mass Spectrometry (2022-2024), after serving as Vice President for Programs from 2020 to 2022.

Awards and honors 
 2007 Presidential Early Career Award (PECASE) for Scientists and Engineers
 2007 U.S. Department of Energy's Office of Science and its National Nuclear Security Administration Early Career Scientist and Engineer Award
 2008 American Society for Mass Spectrometry Biemann Medal
 2011 American Chemical Society Women Chemists Committee Rising Star Award
 2011 Pacific Northwest National Laboratory Fellow
 2014 Pacific Northwest National Laboratory Director's Science and Engineering Achievement Award
 2017 Medal of the Russian Society for Mass Spectrometry
 2018 Purdue University Innovators Hall of Fame
 2019 American Society for Mass Spectrometry Ron Hites Award, along with co-authors for the article titled, Towards High-Resolution Tissue Imaging Using Nanospray Desorption Electrospray Ionization Mass Spectrometry Coupled to Shear Force Microscopy 
 2022 Brazilian Society of Mass Spectrometry Manuel Riveros Medal

Selected publications

Books

References 

American people of Russian descent
Peter the Great St. Petersburg Polytechnic University alumni
Hebrew University of Jerusalem alumni
Purdue University people
University of Delaware people
Mass spectrometrists
Russian women chemists
Academic journal editors
1967 births
Living people